Alone is the ninth single by B'z, released on October 10, 1991. This song is one of B'z many number-one singles in Oricon chart. The single was re-released in 2003, and re-entered at #8. It sold over 1,127,000 copies according to Oricon. It was used as the drama Hotel Woman's theme song. The song was the 10th best selling single of 1991 and the 56th best selling single of 1992, making their only single to chart for two years in the yearly charts.

In 2011, the song was certified digitally by the RIAJ as a gold single for being downloaded more than 100,000 times to cellphones since its release as a digital download in early 2005.

Track listing 
Alone
Go-Go-Girls

Certifications

References

External links
B'z official website

1991 singles
B'z songs
Oricon Weekly number-one singles
Japanese television drama theme songs
Songs written by Tak Matsumoto
Songs written by Koshi Inaba
BMG Japan singles
1991 songs